is a Japanese former wrestler who competed in the 1972 Summer Olympics.

References

1951 births
Living people
Olympic wrestlers of Japan
Wrestlers at the 1972 Summer Olympics
Japanese male sport wrestlers
Olympic silver medalists for Japan
Olympic medalists in wrestling
Asian Games medalists in wrestling
Wrestlers at the 1970 Asian Games
Medalists at the 1972 Summer Olympics
Asian Games gold medalists for Japan
Medalists at the 1970 Asian Games
20th-century Japanese people
21st-century Japanese people